Duncan Campbell Walker (12 October 1899 – 9 September 1963) was a Scottish association football player for clubs including Dumbarton, St Mirren and Nottingham Forest. He finished as the top scorer in the Scottish Football League Division One in the 1921–22 season.

Career

Nottingham Forest
Walker made his debut for Nottingham Forest on 25 August 1923 away at Everton and scored his first goal in his second game on 27 August 1923 at home to West Bromwich Albion. He finished as Forest's top scorer in the 1923–24 season with 17 league goals. In 1924–25 he again finished top scorer with eight goals, but the team was relegated to the Second Division. His last game for the club was on 15 April 1927.

References

1899 births
1963 deaths
Dumbarton F.C. players
Nottingham Forest F.C. players
People from Alloa
Scottish Football League players
Scottish Junior Football Association players
Scottish footballers
Kilsyth Rangers F.C. players
St Mirren F.C. players
Bo'ness F.C. players
Scottish league football top scorers
Association football forwards
Sportspeople from Clackmannanshire